Karl-Gunnar "Kalle" Björklund (born 2 December 1953) is a Swedish former football player and coach. He has served as coach in several clubs in Scandinavia. As a player, Björklund earned 14 caps for Sweden, and the midfielder won Allsvenskan with Östers IF three times. He is the father of Joachim Björklund.

Player career
Born in Växjö, Björklund started playing football in the local club Växjö Norra IF, before he moved to Östers IF as a youth-player. He won Allsvenskan with the club in 1978, 1980 and 1981. In total he played 215 matches and scored 24 goal for Östers IF. He later played for IFK Värnamo, where he played 20 matches and scored two goals. Björklund was capped 14 times and scored one goal while playing for Sweden.

Coaching career
He started his coaching career at the youth department of Östers IF in 1987, before he moved on to Norwegian club Brann, where he was head coach in 1991 and 1992. After spells in Kalmar FF, Örgryte IS and IF Elfsborg, he started to in the Swedish Football Association as a youth developer.

He moved to Molde FK ahead of the 2001-season, where he became Gunder Bengtsson assistant coach. Molde FK finished second in Tippeligaen in 2002, but Bengtsson and Björklund got fired in May the next season, with the team positioned in 10th place with five points after six matches. Björklund then became head coach of Larvik Fotball ahead of the 2004-season, but he left Larvik after a half season with the Norwegian Second Division side. In November 2004 he was hired as Mats Jingblad's assistant coach of Landskrona BoIS, before both Jingblad and Björklund quit their job at Landskrona BoIS on year later, and Björklund returned to his old club IFK Värnamo as Sports Director.

Björklund later worked full-time as a sport teacher at the John Bauer school in Östersund and in the spring of 2008 he took over the coaching job at the third tier side Östersunds FK. After a losing streak at the start of the 2009 season he resigned from his post. For the 2010 season he was signed by local rivals IFK Östersund. In December 2010 he returned to his old club Östers IF as Roar Hansen's assistant coach. They left the position at the end of 2012 and Björklund followed Hansen to Helsingborgs IF in the following season. He then returned to Östers IF as assistant coach to Thomas Askebrand for the 2015 season. The duo left the club at the end of 2016.

On 1 February 2017, he took charge of Ängelholms FF. He left the position at the end of 2017. He was then working as an instructor at Osbecksgymnasiet in Laholm, a sports highs school (which he had worked for in 2006-2007 and then hired again since 2010) and as head coach of Laholms FK's U16 team. In September 2018, Kalle was reunited with Thomas Askebrand when he was hired as his assistant at Örgryte IS.

He left the club at the end of 2018 to become head coach of Laholms FK He left the position in July 2019 and returned to Östers IF once again as assistant coach to newly appointed head coach Denis Velić.

Personal life
Kalle Björklund is the father of the former Swedish international player Joachim Björklund.

References

1953 births
Living people
People from Växjö
Swedish footballers
Association football midfielders
Allsvenskan players
Östers IF players
IFK Värnamo players
Swedish football managers
SK Brann managers
Kalmar FF managers
Örgryte IS managers
IF Elfsborg managers
Östersunds FK managers
Swedish expatriate football managers
Expatriate football managers in Norway
Swedish expatriate sportspeople in Norway
Molde FK non-playing staff
Sweden international footballers
Sportspeople from Kronoberg County